Gary Schofield may refer to:

 Garry Schofield (born 1965), English former rugby league footballer
 Gary Schofield (artist), New Zealand artist, writer, musician, television producer, president of Global Concern, Inc.